Simon John Hackney (born 5 February 1984) is an English footballer who plays for Northwich Victoria.

Club career

Carlisle United
Hackney joined Nantwich Town in November 2001, leaving for Woodley Sports in the summer of 2003.  He impressed on trial from the non-league outfit, scoring two goals in two games for the reserves, he signed for Carlisle United in February 2005. He made his debut for Carlisle as a substitute in Carlisle's 3–0 win away at Canvey Island he only made one more appearance for the season again as a sub in a loss against Forest Green Rovers. At the end of the season Carlisle were promoted to League Two, in the 2005–06 season he made many more appearances for Carlisle although most of them came after being brought into the game as a sub. He also scored his first professional goal in Carlisle's 5–0 win against Rushden & Diamonds he also scored a second goal in this game, these were 2 of the 6 goals he scored in his 30 league appearances this season that made him a key part of the promotion winning team. After helping Carlisle to gain their second successive promotion up to League One. During Carlisle's first season in league one Hackney was only able to make 18 appearances this was due to him picking up a serious injury to his knee cartilage in December, however in these 18 games he did manage to score two goals. Hackney managed to recover from his knee injury in time for the 2007–08 season which enabled him to make himself a key part of the team which led to him making 45 league appearances for the club scoring eight times including a vital goal to help Carlisle end Leeds United's undefeated start to the season and help them defeat Leeds 3–1. During the first half of the 2008–09 season he made 22 appearances for Carlisle but only managed to score one goal against Crewe Alexandra, however towards the middle of the season his form dropped slightly and Jeff Smith took his place in the starting line up. Colchester United made two enquires which were both rejected after one reportedly being £25,000 being called 'a mickey take', then Colchester came back with an improved 'six-figure' offer which Carlisle accepted on 26 January. During his time at Carlisle, Hackney made over 100 appearances for the club, helped them gain successive promotions and became a huge favourite with the fans.

Colchester United
Simon arrived at the Weston Homes Community Stadium during the January transfer window of 2009 for an undisclosed fee, believed to be in the region of £120,000 and immediately became a fans favourite with his skilful and exciting performances on the left wing for Colchester. He provided several assists in the opening games of the 2009–10 season, including 3 assists in the 7–1 victory versus Norwich City and the assist for the 2nd goal against Yeovil Town. Simon scored his first goal of the season with an injury time free kick against Leyton Orient at the end of a 2–1 home defeat in the League Cup 1st Round. He also scored in the FA Cup 1st Round against Bromley on 7 November 2009. After leaving the U's twice on loan to League Two clubs, it was clear his future lied away from Colchester United and subsequently he was released from his contract on 4 May 2011.

Morecambe
On 8 March 2010 Hackney joined Morecambe on a month-long loan, which was later extended to 8 May with the option of the play-off games if needed. Due to a 24-hour recall clause in the deal, Aidy Boothroyd recalled him back to Colchester on 15 April.

Rochdale
On 24 June 2011 Hackney signed a one-year deal at Spotland. He had an incredible pre-season where he was the goal threat but an abdominal injury limited him to a total of 2 appearances in the league campaign.

On 5 July 2012, he joined Wrexham on trial along with ex Coventry City midfielder Kevin Thornton and former Tranmere Rovers goalkeeper Andy Coughlin.

Halifax Town
On 14 September 2012 Hackney signed from Conference North side FC Halifax Town on a one-month trial, making his debut as a 60th-minute substitute a day later in a 5–0 victory over Gloucester City.

Hereford United
On 7 December 2012 Hackney signed for Hereford United but left the club on 8 January 2013 after only making one league appearance against Barrow.

Stockport County
In February 2013, Hackney signed for Stockport County on non-contract terms.

Northwich Victoria
In September 2013, Hackney signed for Northwich Victoria.

Career statistics

Club 

Does not include Football League Trophy appearances.

Honours

Club
Carlisle United
 Football League Two Winner (1): 2005–06

References

External links

Living people
1984 births
English footballers
Footballers from Manchester
Association football wingers
Stockport Sports F.C. players
Carlisle United F.C. players
Colchester United F.C. players
Morecambe F.C. players
Oxford United F.C. players
Rochdale A.F.C. players
FC Halifax Town players
Hereford United F.C. players
Stockport County F.C. players
Northwich Victoria F.C. players
Northern Premier League players
National League (English football) players
English Football League players